Arian Kabashi may refer to:

Arian Kabashi (footballer, born 1996), football player
Arian Kabashi (footballer, born 1997), football player